Jakob Börjesson (born 10 January 1976) is a Swedish biathlete. He competed in the men's relay event at the 2006 Winter Olympics.

References

External links
 

1976 births
Living people
Swedish male biathletes
Olympic biathletes of Sweden
Biathletes at the 2006 Winter Olympics
People from Kungsbacka
Sportspeople from Halland County
21st-century Swedish people